Eubela mcgintyi is a species of sea snail, a marine gastropod mollusk in the family Raphitomidae.

Description
The length of the shell attains 5.4 mm.

Distribution
E. mcgintyi can be found in waters off both coasts of Florida atdepths between 55 m to 146 m .

References

 Schwengel, J. S. "New marine shells from Florida." The Nautilus 56.3 (1943): 75-78.
 Poirier, H. 1954. An Up-to-date Systematic List of 3200 Seashells from Greenland to Texas  215 pp.

External links
 Biolib.cz: original image
 

mcgintyi
Gastropods described in 1943